
Year 894 (DCCCXCIV) was a common year starting on Tuesday (link will display the full calendar) of the Julian calendar.

Events 
 By place 
 Byzantine Empire 
 Byzantine–Bulgarian War: Stylianos Zaoutzes, leading minister and basileopator, convinces Emperor Leo VI (the Wise) to move the Bulgarian market from Constantinople to Thessaloniki. This affects the commercial importance of Bulgarian trade. Simeon I, ruler (khan) of the Bulgarian Empire, mobilizes his Bulgarian forces and invades Byzantine territory, ravaging the countryside.

 Europe 
 Spring – King Arnulf of Carinthia invades Italy at the head of an East Frankish expeditionary army, joining up with the deposed king Berengar I at Verona. He conquers Brescia after little resistance, and sacks Bergamo after a one-month siege. The cities of Milan and Pavia open their doors to Arnulf. Emperor Guy III escapes from Pavia, to hide in the mountains of Spoleto (Umbria).
 March – Arnulf of Carinthia proceeds to Piacenza, and from there invades central Italy. After a successful campaign, he calls the invasion off and returns to Pavia – probably because Duke Rudolph I of Burgundy was threatening to invade Lorraine. Arnulf has himself proclaimed King of Italy at Pavia, leaving Berengar I as his vice-regent in Italy. 
 Arnulf of Carinthia returns to Germany through the Alps, harried by militias dispatched by Rudolph I of Burgundy and margrave Anscar I of Ivrea. Only with much difficulty is Arnulf able to get his army through the Aosta Valley and through St. Moritz, back into Germany. Guy III descends from the Apennines, and re-seizes the Italian kingdom.
 December – Guy III dies after a 4-year reign, and is succeeded by his 14-year-old son Lambert, already associated as co-emperor since 892. At the pleading of Archbishop Fulk of Reims, Pope Formosus reconciles with the young emperor. Lambert proceeds from Spoleto to Pavia, where he is acclaimed and crowned with the Iron Crown of Lombardy.
 Svatopluk I, ruler (knyaz) of Great Moravia, dies after a 34-year reign, in which he has united the Slavic tribes in his kingdom. He is succeeded by his eldest son Mojmir II. The Principality of Nitra (modern-day Slovakia) is given as an appanage to his brother Svatopluk II.
 Árpád, head of the confederation of the Hungarian tribes, comes to an agreement with the prince of the Moravians, Svatopluk II, that Hungarian and Moravian armies will together expel the Eastern Franks from Pannonia.
 Prince Petar of Serbia defeats his revolting cousin Bran; he is captured and blinded (according to a Byzantine tradition that meant to disqualify a person from taking the throne).

 Britain 
 The Vikings in Northumbria and East Anglia swear allegiance and hand over hostages to King Alfred the Great, but promptly break their truce by attacking the southwest of England. A Viking force returns from Exeter and sails along the coast, in an attempt to plunder Chichester. They are defeated by the Saxon garrison, losing many ships and men.
 King Anarawd of Gwynedd's shaky alliance with the Vikings collapses. His kingdom is ravaged by the Norsemen. Anarawd is forced to ask for help from Alfred the Great and submits to his overlordship. Alfred imposes oppressive terms and forces Anarawd's confirmation in the Christian Church, with Alfred as 'godfather'.
 Autumn – Battle of Benfleet: Danish Viking forces retire to Essex, after being deprived of food by Alfred the Great (see 893). They draw their longships up the Thames and into the Lea, entrenching themselves at Benfleet.

 Japan 
 Emperor Uda orders commercial relations (called Imperial Japanese embassies to China) to cease with China (approximate date).

Births 
 Æthelstan, king of England (approximate date)
 Emma, queen of the West Frankish Kingdom (d. 934)
 Flodoard, Frankish canon and chronicler (or 893)
 Michael Maleinos, Byzantine nobleman and monk (d. 963)
 Matilda of Ringelheim, queen of Germany (approximate date)
 Minamoto no Tsunemoto, Japanese prince and samurai (d. 961)
 Ono no Michikaze, Japanese calligrapher (d. 966)

Deaths 
 April 8 – Adalelm, Frankish nobleman
 August 31 – Ahmad ibn Muhammad al-Ta'i, Muslim governor
 December 12 – Guy III, king of Italy and Holy Roman Emperor
 Ali ebn-e Sahl Esfahani, Persian mystic
 Cynemund, bishop of Hereford (approximate date)
 Dae Hyeonseok, king of Balhae (Korea)
 Deng Chuna, Chinese warlord and governor
 Ibn Abi al-Dunya, Muslim scholar
 Kang Junli, general of the Tang Dynasty (b. 847)
 Svatopluk I, ruler (knyaz) of Great Moravia
 Yang Fugong, Chinese eunuch official

References